Dilshan is a common Sinhalese name.

Dilshan may refer to:

Surname
Chamod Dilshan, Sri Lankan footballer
Chanuk Dilshan, Sri Lankan cricketer
Dinuka Dilshan, Sri Lankan cricketer
Kavika Dilshan, Sri Lankan cricketer
Lahiru Dilshan, Sri Lankan cricketer
Pasindu Dilshan, Sri Lankan cricketer
Pathum Dilshan, Sri Lankan cricketer
Rajitha Dilshan, Sri Lankan cricketer
Rashmika Dilshan, Sri Lankan cricketer
Sasika Dilshan, Sri Lankan cricketer
Tharindu Dilshan, Sri Lankan cricketer
Thisara Dilshan, Sri Lankan cricketer
Thulina Dilshan, Sri Lankan cricketer
Tillakaratne Dilshan, Sri Lankan former cricketer

Given name
Dilshan Abeysinghe, Sri Lankan cricketer
Dilshan de Soysa, Sri Lankan cricketer
Dilshan Kanchana, Sri Lankan cricketer
Dilshan Kollure, Sri Lankan cricketer
Dilshan Madushanka, Sri Lankan cricketer
Dilshan Mendis, Sri Lankan cricketer
Dilshan Munaweera, Sri Lankan cricketer
Dilshan Sanjeewa, Sri Lankan cricketer
Dilshan Vitharana, Sri Lankan cricketer
Ranindu Dilshan Liyanage, Sri Lankan chess player

Sinhalese surnames
Sinhalese masculine given names